{{DISPLAYTITLE:Pi2 Cygni}}

Pi2 Cygni, Latinized from π2 Cygni, is a triple star system in the northern constellation of Cygnus. It is visible to the naked eye about 2.5° east-northeast of the open cluster M39, having an apparent visual magnitude of 4.24. Based upon an annual parallax shift of 2.95 mas, it is located at a distance of roughly 1,100 light years from the Sun.

The inner pair of stars in this system form a single-lined spectroscopic binary with an orbital period of 72.0162 days and an eccentricity of 0.34. The primary, component A, is a B-type giant star with a stellar classification of B2.5 III. It is a Beta Cephei variable with an estimated 8.4 times the mass of the Sun and around 7.1 times the Sun's radius. The star is roughly 33 million years old and is spinning with a projected rotational velocity of 50 km/s. It is radiating 8,442 times the solar luminosity from its outer atmosphere at an effective temperature of around 20,815 K.

The third member of this system is a magnitude 5.98 star at an angular separation of 0.10 arc seconds along a position angle of 129°, as of 1996.

Historical names
Consequently, the Chinese name for π2 Cygni itself is 

References

B-type giants
Beta Cephei variables
Spectroscopic binaries
Triple star systems
Cygni, Pi2
Cygnus (constellation)
BD+58 3504
Cygni, 81
207330
107533
8335